Gilbert Warrenton (March 7, 1894, Paterson, New Jersey - August 21, 1980, Riverside County, California) was a prominent American silent and sound film cinematographer. He filmed over 150 films before his death. Notable credits include The Cat and the Canary (1927) and several B-movies of the 1950s and 1960s.

He was the son of actress Lule Warrenton.

Selected filmography

Kinkaid, Gambler (1916)
The Hard Rock Breed (1918)
 Fair Enough (1918)
The Law of the Great Northwest (1918)
 The Golden Fleece (1918)
Humoresque (1920)
The Plaything of Broadway (1921)
The Land of Hope (1921)
Hush Money (1921)
The Lane That Had No Turning (1922)
Little Old New York (1923)
Under the Red Robe (1923)
The Leopardess (1923)
 Flowing Gold (1924)
Secrets of the Night (1924)
 Love and Glory (1924)
The Plastic Age (1925)
The Last Edition (1925)
 Smilin' at Trouble (1925)
 Seven Days (1925)
The Meddler (1925)
 The Burning Trail (1925)
 The Other Woman's Story (1925)
 California Straight Ahead (1925)
 Butterflies in the Rain (1926)
 The Traffic Cop (1926)
 Tom and His Pals (1926)
 Somebody's Mother (1926)
 Prisoners of the Storm (1926)
 A Man's Past (1927)
Taxi! Taxi! (1927)
The Cat and the Canary (1927)
The Man Who Laughs (1928)
Jazz Mad (1928)
Show Boat (1929)
The Love Trap (1929)
The Mississippi Gambler (1929)
Captain of the Guard (1930)
Ten Cents a Dance (1931)
If I Had a Million (1932)
Mama Loves Papa (1933)
 Devil's Mate (1933)
 Ticket to a Crime (1934)
Champagne for Breakfast (1935)
 Headline Crasher (1936)Breezing Home (1937)Rose of the Rio Grande (1938)
 Saleslady (1938)Under the Big Top (1938)
 The Marines Are Here (1938)They Raid By Night (1942)Parole, Inc. (1948)The Great Dan Patch (1949)
 Roll, Thunder, Roll! (1949)
 Ride, Ryder, Ride! (1949)
 Hot Rod (1950)County Fair (1950)The Great Jesse James Raid (1953)High School Hellcats (1958)South Pacific (1958)The Legend of Tom Dooley (1959)The Clown and the Kid (1961)Operation Bikini'' (1963)

External links
 

American cinematographers
1894 births
1980 deaths